Lake Hopatcong is a census-designated place (CDP) in Jefferson Township, Morris County, New Jersey, United States. It includes communities on the northeast side of Lake Hopatcong, the largest freshwater body in the state.

Lakefront communities in the CDP include Espanong, Prospect Point, Raccoon Island, and Woodport, and inland communities include Hurdtown, Tierneys Corner, and Berkshire Valley. The CDP is bordered to the west, across the lake, by the borough of Hopatcong in Sussex County, and to the south it is bordered by Mount Arlington in Roxbury Township and by the Lower Berkshire Valley CDP. Lake Shawnee is in the northeast part of the CDP.

New Jersey Route 15 passes through the eastern side of the Lake Hopatcong CDP, leading south  to Interstate 80 in Wharton and north  to Sparta.

The community was first listed as a CDP prior to the 2020 census.

Demographics

Notable people 

People who were born in, residents of, or otherwise closely associated with Lake Hopatcong include:
 Jaren Sina (born 1994), professional basketball player, who played for Astoria Bydgoszcz of the Polish Basketball League.

References 

Census-designated places in Morris County, New Jersey
Census-designated places in New Jersey
Jefferson Township, New Jersey